Charles Jean-Baptiste des Gallois de La Tour (1715–1802) was a French public official. He served as the last First President of the Parliament of Aix-en-Provence from 1748 to 1771, and from 1775 to 1790.

Biography

Early life
Charles Jean-Baptiste des Gallois de La Tour was born in 1715 in Paris. His father, Jean-Baptiste des Gallois de La Tour, served as First President of the Parliament of Aix-en-Provence from 1735 to 1747.

Career
He served as an Advisor to the Parliament of Aix-en-Provence in 1735. Later, he served as its last First President from 1748 to 1771, and from 1775 to 1790.

Personal life
He married Marie-Madeleine d'Aligre, daughter of Étienne Claude d'Aligre, who served as the Second President of the Parliament of Paris and one of the wealthiest aristocrats in France at the time.

In 1771, he purchased the Château de Saint Aubin in Saint-Aubin-sur-Loire from Charles Guillaume Le Normant d'Étiolles (1717-1799).

He died in 1802.

References 

1715 births
1802 deaths
Civil servants from Paris
People from Aix-en-Provence